The 1972–73 Southern Football League season was the 70th in the history of the league, an English football competition.

Kettering Town won the championship, winning their third Southern League title, whilst Atherstone Town, Grantham, Maidstone United and Tonbridge were all promoted to the Premier Division. Eight Southern League clubs applied to join the Football League at the end of the season, but none were successful.

Premier Division
The Premier Division consisted of 22 clubs, including 18 clubs from the previous season and four new clubs:
Two clubs promoted from Division One North:
Burton Albion
Kettering Town

Two clubs promoted from Division One South:
Ramsgate Athletic, who were renamed Ramsgate at the end of the previous season
Waterlooville

League table

Division One North
Division One North consisted of 22 clubs, including 13 clubs from the previous season and nine new clubs:
Six clubs joined from the West Midlands (Regional) League:
Atherstone Town
Bedworth United
Bromsgrove Rovers
Kidderminster Harriers
Redditch United
Tamworth

Plus:
Enderby Town, joined from the Leicestershire Senior League
Grantham, joined from the Midland League
Merthyr Tydfil, relegated from the Premier Division

At the end of the season Lockheed Leamington was renamed AP Leamington.

League table

Division One South
Division One South consisted of 22 clubs, including 13 clubs from the previous season and nine new clubs:
Two clubs relegated from the Premier Division:
Bath City
Gravesend & Northfleet

Three clubs transferred from Division One North:
Bletchley Town
Dunstable Town
Wealdstone

Three clubs joined from the Western League
Bideford
Dorchester Town
Minehead

Plus:
Bognor Regis Town, joined from the Sussex County League

League table

Football League elections
Alongside the four League clubs facing re-election, a total of 10 non-League clubs applied for election, eight of which were Southern League clubs. All the League clubs were re-elected.

See also
 Southern Football League
 1972–73 Northern Premier League

References
RSSF – Southern Football League archive

Southern Football League seasons
S